Julien Féret (born 5 July 1982) is a French former professional footballer who plays as an attacking midfielder. He was nominated for Goal of the Year by the UNFP after his goal against Evian on 28 November 2011. In May 2019, at the age of 36, Féret announced his retirement.

References

External links
 
 
 

1982 births
Living people
Sportspeople from Côtes-d'Armor
French footballers
Footballers from Brittany
Association football midfielders
Ligue 1 players
Ligue 2 players
AS Cherbourg Football players
Chamois Niortais F.C. players
Stade de Reims players
AS Nancy Lorraine players
Stade Rennais F.C. players
Stade Malherbe Caen players
AJ Auxerre players
Brittany international footballers